Chatrapatti is a village in madurai north Taluk in Madurai district of the Indian state of Tamil Nadu.

References 

Villages in Madurai district